The Noiseless Dead (Spanish: Hay muertos que no hacen ruido) is a 1946 Mexican comedy horror film directed by Humberto Gómez Landero and starring Germán Valdés, Marcelo Chávez and Amanda del Llano.

Cast
 Germán Valdés 
 Marcelo Chávez 
 Amanda del Llano
 Tony Díaz
 Francisco Reiguera
 Eugenia Galindo 
 Ángel T. Sala 
 Humberto Rodríguez 
 Ramón G. Larrea 
 Ramiro Gamboa 
 Jane Ross
 Héctor Mateos

References

Bibliography 
 Carlos Monsiváis & John Kraniauskas. Mexican Postcards. Verso, 1997.

External links 
 

1946 films
1940s comedy horror films
Mexican comedy horror films
1940s Spanish-language films
Films directed by Humberto Gómez Landero
Mexican black-and-white films
1946 comedy films

1946 horror films
1940s Mexican films